Tred Barta (March 28, 1952 – August 3, 2019) was an American hunter, fisherman, and outdoorsman who hosted The Best and Worst of Tred Barta on the TV channel Versus. As a fisherman, Barta had amassed several world records, some still current.

Life
Barta experienced spinal stroke and cancer in 2009, leaving him paralyzed from the armpits down. However, Barta continued to hunt and fish as he did before the accident.

Hunting
When hunting, Barta relied predominantly on a longbow and homemade cedar arrows instead of more modern tools. From his website: "Barta eschews modern contrivances and overly sentimental views of nature and favors a "common man" approach grounded in respect for animals he hunts and the view that the pursuit can be as meaningful as killing the animal. In keeping with this, he does not consider a hunt a failure simply because no game is taken."

References

External links
Tred Barta's back on the air (Vail Daily - February 27, 2010)
An Eagle man's accelerated course on life (Vail Daily - June 18, 2009)

1952 births
2019 deaths
American television personalities
American hunters
University of Colorado alumni
World record holders